It Will Be Me may refer to:

 "It Will Be Me", a song by Faith Hill from Breathe
 "It Will Be Me", a song by Melissa Etheridge from the Brother Bear 2 soundtrack